Hugo Jarquín (born 1 June 1966) is a Mexican politician affiliated with the PRD. He currently serves as Deputy of the LXII Legislature of the Mexican Congress representing Oaxaca.

References

1966 births
Living people
People from Oaxaca City
Deputies of the LXII Legislature of Mexico
Party of the Democratic Revolution politicians
21st-century Mexican politicians
Members of the Chamber of Deputies (Mexico) for Oaxaca